Vasco André Moreira da Rocha (born 29 January 1989) is a Portuguese professional footballer who plays for C.D. Trofense as a midfielder.

Club career
Born in Paredes, Porto District, Rocha spent his first six years as a senior competing in the third and fourth divisions of Portuguese football, with hometown's U.S.C. Paredes. In summer 2012 he signed for C.D. Aves in the Segunda Liga, making his debut as a professional on 5 August in a 3−1 away loss against C.D. Santa Clara in the Portuguese League Cup.

On 4 June 2014, Rocha signed a three-year contract with Primeira Liga club F.C. Paços de Ferreira. His first match in the competition occurred on 17 August, when he came on as a late substitute in a 2–0 away defeat to S.L. Benfica.

Rocha scored his first goal in the Portuguese top flight on 10 January 2015, contributing to a 2–2 draw at Académica de Coimbra. On 30 April 2017, his 88th-minute individual effort which concluded a 2–1 away win over C.F. Belenenses and certified his team's survival received widespread media coverage.

On 3 May 2017, Rocha agreed to a two-year extension at the Estádio da Mata Real. Halfway through his side's conquest of the 2018–19 LigaPro, he moved on loan to Varzim S.C. for the rest of the season. On 24 February 2019, he was sent off in a goalless draw at Vitória S.C. B.

Personal life
Rocha's older brother, Romeu, was also a footballer and a midfielder. He shared teams with his sibling on several occasions.

References

External links

1989 births
Living people
People from Paredes, Portugal
Sportspeople from Porto District
Portuguese footballers
Association football midfielders
Primeira Liga players
Liga Portugal 2 players
Segunda Divisão players
U.S.C. Paredes players
FC Porto players
Padroense F.C. players
C.D. Aves players
F.C. Paços de Ferreira players
C.D. Feirense players
Varzim S.C. players
C.D. Trofense players